This is a list of Derbyshire first-class cricket records; that is, record team and individual performances in first-class cricket for Derbyshire. Records for Derbyshire in List A cricket, the shorter form of the game, are found at List of Derbyshire List A cricket records.

Notation
Team Notation: When a team score is listed as "300-3", this indicates that they have scored 300 runs for the loss of 3 wickets. If it is followed by a "d", this indicates that the side declared. When the team score is listed as "300", this means the side was all out.

Batting Notation: When a batsman's score is listed as "100", the batsman scored 100 runs and was out. If it followed by an asterisk *, the batsman was not out.

Bowling Notation: "5/100" indicates that the bowler took 5 wickets while conceding 100 runs.

Team Records

Batting Records

Bowling Records

Partnership Records

Derbyshire
Derbyshire County Cricket Club
Cricket